120th meridian may refer to:

120th meridian east, a line of longitude east of the Greenwich Meridian
120th meridian west, a line of longitude west of the Greenwich Meridian